Square Forms and Circles is a 1963 outdoor sculpture by Barbara Hepworth, installed at Montreal's McGill University, in Quebec, Canada.

References

External links
 

1963 sculptures
1963 establishments in Canada
McGill University
Outdoor sculptures in Montreal
Sculptures by Barbara Hepworth